Dr. Ragan (Ray) Callaway is a prominent plant and community ecologist that obtained his Masters of Science at the University of Tennessee in 1983 and his Doctor of Philosophy at the University of California, Santa Barbara in 1990 [1]. Currently, he researches and teaches out of the University of Montana in Missoula, Montana, USA [1]. His research concentrates on the interactions within plant communities and ecosystems, predominantly those in alpine environments [1].

His most highly cited papers investigate both the direct and indirect interactions between plants and with other organisms [1,2,3,4,5]. More specifically, these interactions include resource competition, allelopathy, facilitation/mutualisms [2,3] and interactions with invasive species [4,5], as well as soil microbe [6], herbivore and competitor-mediated interactions [7].

See also
 Suzanne Simard

References

1. Callaway, R. 2014. Ragan (Ray) Callaway's Plant Community Ecology Lab University of Montana. [online] Available at: https://archive.today/20141105035557/http://plantecology.dbs.umt.edu/ [Accessed: 4 Mar 2014].
2. Bertness, M. D., & Callaway, R. 1994. Positive interactions in communities. Trends in Ecology & Evolution, 9(5): 191–193.
3. Callaway, R. M. 1995. Positive interactions among plants. The Botanical Review, 61(4): 306–349.
4. Callaway, R. M., & Aschehoug, E. T. 2000. Invasive plants versus their new and old neighbors: a mechanism for exotic invasion. Science, 290(5491): 521–523.
5. Callaway, R. M., & Ridenour, W. M. 2004. Novel weapons: invasive success and the evolution of increased competitive ability. Frontiers in Ecology and the Environment, 2(8): 436–443.
6. Callaway, R. M., Thelen, G. C., Rodriguez, A., & Holben, W. E. 2004. Soil biota and exotic plant invasion. Nature, 427(6976): 731–733.
7. Callaway, R. M., & Walker, L. R. 1997. Competition and facilitation: a synthetic approach to interactions in plant communities. Ecology, 78(7): 1958–1965.

American ecologists
Year of birth missing (living people)
Living people
University of Montana faculty
University of Tennessee alumni
University of California, Santa Barbara alumni